The Arkansas Razorbacks gymnastics team represents the University of Arkansas and competes in the SEC Conference. The team was founded in 2003 and is currently coached by Jordyn Wieber, after she assumed the position in April 2019.

History 
The gymnastics team was founded in 2003 by Mark Cook, who started building the team in 2001. Cook had previously coached the Stanford gymnastics and UCLA Bruins teams, as the head coach and assistant coach respectively. The first team competed in the 2003, with an all-freshman roster, and finished the regular season ranked 41st.

The team made their first appearance at the NCAA National Championship finals ('Super Six') in 2009, finishing in 5th place with a score of 196.475 - their best placement to date. The Razorbacks made their second appearance in 2012, finishing in 6th place with a score of 196.300.

The retirement of Mark Cook as head coach was announced on April 9, 2019. The new head coach for the 2019-2020 season was announced to be the 2011 World Champion Jordyn Wieber on April 24 - the first Olympic champion to be the head coach of an NCAA gymnastics team.  Wieber was previously a volunteer assistant coach at UCLA, at which she coached floor, which UCLA finished the 2018 and 2019 regular seasons ranked No. 1 in the country.

Championships

Super Six Appearances

Individual champions

Current roster

2022–23 roster

Future recruits 
2024–25
 Joscelyn Roberson, World Champions Centre

Coaches

Head coaches

Coaches for the 2022–23 season

References 

 
Arkansas Razorbacks